Øljusjøen is a lake in the municipalities of Hemsedal (in Viken county) and Lærdal (in Vestland county), Norway.

Øljusjøen has a hydroelectric dam at the north end which directs water to a power station nearby.  The water eventually goes into the Mørkedøla river.

See also
List of lakes in Norway

References

Lakes of Viken (county)
Lakes of Vestland
Lærdal
Hemsedal
Reservoirs in Norway